WMFG (1240 AM) is a radio station broadcasting an Adult Standards format. Licensed to Hibbing, Minnesota, United States, the station serves the Iron Range area. The station is currently owned by Midwest Communications and features programming from Westwood One and Dial Global.

Midwest also owns five radio stations on the Iron Range; WMFG, WMFG-FM, WNMT, WTBX, WUSZ. All five stations share the same studio location at 807 W. 37th Street, Hibbing.

History
WMFG signed on the air on October 12, 1935 with studios in the Androy Hotel in downtown Hibbing, Minnesota.  The station became affiliated with CBS in September 1937.  As a CBS affiliate it carried the famous October 30, 1938, War of the Worlds broadcast.  In June 1942, WMFG dropped CBS and joined the NBC Red.  It remained with NBC until the early 1960s.  By 1962, it was an independent station.  WMFG was one of the original affiliates of the Minnesota Twins Radio Network in 1961.  The station joined ABC in 1968 and remained with ABC until the mid-1980s.  Station management decided to pick up the call signs of Duluth beautiful music Station WGGR in 1983. Those call signs were dropped when the format changed at the Duluth outlet. The station applied for and was granted the call signs WGGR on November 1, 1983. On August 5, 1987, the station changed its call sign back to the original WMFG.

References

External links

Radio stations in Minnesota
Adult standards radio stations in the United States
Radio stations established in 1935
1935 establishments in Minnesota
Midwest Communications radio stations